Heinsohn is a surname. Notable people with the surname include:

Dora Henninges Heinsohn (1861–1900), American opera singer
Elisa Heinsohn (born 1962), American actress
Gunnar Heinsohn (born 1943), German sociologist and economist
Tom Heinsohn (1934–2020), American basketball player

German-language surnames